Drag It Up is a studio album by American country/rock band Old 97's, released in 2004 (see 2004 in music). The album's title comes from the fourth track, "Smokers."

The album peaked at #120 on the Billboard 200.

Critical reception
No Depression wrote that "at least half the record is subdued in tone and tempo. If the overall result isn’t quite as rawk, well, the sound suits the songs, and that makes all the difference." The Hartford Courant wrote that "the songwriting is only fair, and the murky songs sound like they were recorded in a tin shed during a heavy downpour." The Cleveland Scene called the album "joyous alt-country."

Track listing
All tracks by Rhett Miller, Ken Bethea, Murry Hammond and Philip Peeples.

"Won't Be Home" - 4:48
"Moonlight" - 3:40
"Borrowed Bride" - 2:08
"Smokers" (vocals by Murry Hammond) - 3:52
"Coahuila" (vocals by Ken Bethea) - 2:27
"Blinding Sheets Of Rain" - 3:20
"Valium Waltz" - 4:39
"In The Satellite Rides A Star" (vocals by Murry Hammond) - 4:40
"The New Kid" - 3:41
"Bloomington" - 3:27
"Adelaide" - 3:29
"Friends Forever" - 3:08
"No Mother" - 4:59

Personnel 
Old 97's
Rhett Miller - lead vocals, rhythm guitar, backup vocals on "Smokers" and "Satellite," additional backup vocals on "Coahulia"
Murry Hammond - bass, backing vocals, harmonium on "No Mother," electric guitar on "New Kid," lead guitar and tambourine on "Bloomington," lead vocals on "Smokers," vocals, acoustic guitar and shaker on "Satellite"
Ken Bethea - lead guitar, accordion, no. 2 plectrum on "No Mother," lead vocals on "Coahulia"
Philip Peeples - drums, shakers, tambourines
Ken, Murry, Rhett and Philip - group backup vocals on "No Mother," "Friends Forever" and "Smokers"
Additional Musicians
Craig Packham - tambourine on "New Kid"
Archie Thompson - piano on "Borrowed Bride"
Mitch Manker - trumpet on "Adelaide," appears courtesy of the Ray Charles Orchestra
Sarah Neill - age 2, backward piano on "Valium Waltz"
Chris Lawrence - pedal steel guitar on "Moonlight" and "Blinding Sheets of Rain"

References

External links
Old 97s drag it up release date july

Old 97's albums
2004 albums
New West Records albums